Rayshad Nichols (born July 9, 1999) is an American football defensive end for the Baltimore Ravens of the National Football League. He played college football at Stephen F. Austin.

Professional career
After not being selected in the 2022 NFL Draft, Nichols signed with the Baltimore Ravens as an undrafted free agent on April 30. On August 30, Nichols was waived by the Ravens. The following day, he was re-signed to the practice squad. Nichols was elevated to the active roster on December 31, and made his debut the following day against the Pittsburgh Steelers, playing fifteen snaps and recording four tackles. He signed a reserve/future contract on January 16, 2023.

References

External links
Baltimore Ravens bio
Stephen F. Austin Lumberjacks bio

1999 births
Living people
American football defensive tackles
Stephen F. Austin Lumberjacks football players
Baltimore Ravens players